Liberation Organization of the People of Afghanistan  (Sazman-e Azadibakhsh-e Mardom-e Afghanistan, SAMA) was a Maoist insurgent group operating in Afghanistan, and based in Parwan Province. It was the main leftist politico-military organization in Afghanistan that fought in opposition to the Democratic Republic of Afghanistan regime and the Soviets. SAMA was led by Majid Kalakani, who intended to turn SAMA into a Maoist styled United Front of forces opposed to the Soviet-backed PDPA.

SAMA was a Marxist–Leninist–Maoist group with links to the Revolutionary Internationalist Movement although not all of its members were Maoists, it rejected the Three Worlds Theory in opposition to Faiz Ahmad's ALO. SAMA had its origins in the Shalleh-ye Javiyd Maoist movement of the 1960s and 1970s.

SAMA was known for its spectacular guerrilla attacks. They often recruited armed outlaws and bandits as guerrillas. SAMA guerrillas attacked Soviet convoys, robbed the government of money supplied to it by the Soviets, and carried out assassinations. In one instance SAMA fighters dressed in army uniforms broke into a military base and looted it of its weapons, and even kidnapped a Soviet general.

After Kalakani's death SAMA stagnated and declined, fighting between SAMA and Hekmatyar's Party of Islam had driven SAMA out of Kalakan and Koh Daman by 1983. By 1983 government forces had infiltrated the SAMA organization and attempted to encourage SAMA to join the Government. When this did not occur the government arrested 60 of the organization's leaders. The new SAMA leadership entered into discussions with government and begun to abandon Maoism and its strategy for New Democracy, causing splits and desertions, as well as the emergence of new Maoist groups. By 1989 the organization ceased to exist.

References

Citations

Bibliography 
 Ideology Without Leadership: The Rise and Decline of Maoism in Afghanistan by Afghanistan Analysts Network
 "Afghanistan Maoists Unite in a Single Party", Shola Jawid (Communist Party of Afghanistan), 1 May 2004

Banned communist parties
Communist parties in Afghanistan
Anti-Soviet factions in the Soviet–Afghan War
Rebel groups in Afghanistan
Clandestine groups
Political parties established in 1977
1977 establishments in Afghanistan
Paramilitary organisations based in Afghanistan
Maoist organisations in Afghanistan